Michal Mertiňák and Petr Pála were the defending champions, but Pala chose not to compete. Mertiňák partnered with František Čermák, and won in the final over Johan Brunström and Jean-Julien Rojer, 6–4, 6–4.

Seeds

Draw

Draw

External links
Draw

Doubles